Coming on Strong is the debut studio album by English electronic band Hot Chip. It was released in the United Kingdom on 24 May 2004 by Moshi Moshi Records and in the United States and Canada on 29 November 2005 by Astralwerks, as an extended version with three additional bonus tracks. The album was re-released by Moshi Moshi Records in the United Kingdom on 3 May 2009, as a digital download with four additional bonus tracks. In 2014, it was awarded a silver certification from the Independent Music Companies Association, which indicated sales of at least 20,000 copies throughout Europe.

Critical reception

Coming on Strong received mixed to positive reviews from music critics. At Metacritic, which assigns a normalised rating out of 100 to reviews from mainstream critics, the album received an average score of 67, based on 14 reviews, which indicates "generally favorable reviews". Sean Fennessey of Pitchfork referred to the album as "a successful but safe entrée to the British electro-soul outfit" and said that the album had "kitschy yet deeply affecting lyrics." Rob Theakston of AllMusic described the sound of the album as "quirky electro-pop", whilst Ron Hart wrote for Billboard that the "utilization of American hip-hop scenarios in the context of the English slang is exactly what makes Coming on Strong such a unique listen."

Track listing
All songs written by Alexis Taylor and Joe Goddard.

2005 US and Canadian bonus tracks
"A-B-C" – 4:34
"Hittin' Skittles" – 4:31
"From Drummer to Driver" – 4:24

2009 UK Digital Download bonus tracks
"From Drummer to Driver" – 4:24
"I Don't Know the Half of How to Have a Hope of Holding Back" – 3:04
"Hittin' Skittles" – 4:30
"The Ass Attack (Four Tet Remix)" – 3:01

Personnel
 Owen Clarke – guitar, bass, additional noises, illustration
 Al Doyle – guitar, synthesizer, percussion
 Joe Goddard – vocals, synthesizer, percussion, producer, engineer
 Felix Martin – drum machine, additional noises
 Alexis Taylor – vocals, synthesizer, guitar, percussion, piano, producer, engineer
 Frank Arkwright – mastering
 Scott Bennett – kalimba (track 10)
 Emma Smith – saxophone (track 5)
 Darren Wall – design

References

2004 debut albums
Astralwerks albums
Hot Chip albums
Moshi Moshi Records albums